Bendix Woods County Park is the name of a park located in Olive Township, St. Joseph County, Indiana, south of New Carlisle. The park is under the control of the St. Joseph County Parks and Recreation Department.

The name Bendix Woods originates from the Bendix Corporation which donated the land to the county for the creation of a park. The park's historical significance, however, dates to its establishment by the Studebaker Corporation, formerly of nearby South Bend, Indiana, as the first model test facility for an American automobile company.

Studebaker heavily promoted the grounds as a "million-dollar outdoor testing laboratory" in advertisements. The test track that ran through the grounds simulated a variety of terrains and road conditions. Studebaker landscaped the park by keeping natural features—and planted a huge grove of trees which spell out "STUDEBAKER" when viewed from above.

Following the collapse of Studebaker's U.S. production facilities in 1963, the land was acquired by Bendix Corporation which used the grounds for corporate purposes. In 1996 Bosch purchased the property; in 2015 Navistar acquired it from Bosch and renamed it "Navistar Proving Grounds".

The park was also home to a toboggan roller-coaster that was never opened after its owners were thrown off when making a trial run.

Studebaker Clubhouse
The Studebaker Clubhouse is a historic clubhouse.  It was built in 1926, and is a two-story, "U"-shaped, Colonial Revival style brick building. The front facade features a one-story frame porch supported by Tuscan order columns.  The building was remodeled in 1947, 1961, and 1966–1967.  It was built as a place for the approximately 100 proving ground employees to eat, relax in off hours, stay in bad weather, and board if they so desired. It currently houses the park's Nature Center and offices.

It was listed on the National Register of Historic Places in 1985 along with the Tree Sign.

Tree Sign 
In 1938 the company planted 8,000 pine trees in a pattern that, viewed from above, spelled "STUDEBAKER".

In late December 2004, the "STUDEBAKER" tree planting, recognized as one of the world's largest living advertisements and on the National Register of Historic Places, was severely damaged in a Christmas week ice storm. However, it continues to stand; in 2011 a grant was awarded for its long-term management and preservation, and a management plan was completed in 2012. Dead and diseased trees were removed in 2013 and 2014, and volunteers planted replacement saplings between April 15 and April 19, 2015.

References

External links 
 Bendix Woods County Park (St. Joseph County Parks Department)

Parks in Indiana
County parks in the United States
Protected areas of St. Joseph County, Indiana
Nature centers in Indiana
Studebaker
Clubhouses on the National Register of Historic Places in Indiana
Colonial Revival architecture in Indiana
Buildings and structures completed in 1926
Buildings and structures in St. Joseph County, Indiana
National Register of Historic Places in St. Joseph County, Indiana
Bendix Corporation